Among the many wildflowers in Western Australia, there are around four hundred species of orchids.

Early identifications 
One of the first botanists to study Western Australia was Archibald Menzies, aboard HMS Discovery, who explored King George Sound in 1791. Many of the samples (including orchids) were lost in the return to England, but those that did survive were documented in Prodromus Florae Novae Hollandiae et Insulae Van Diemen, published by Robert Brown in 1810.

The first three orchids from Western Australia to be named were Caladenia menziesii (now Leptoceras menziesii), Caladenia flava, and Diuris longifolia.

In 1802 Robert Brown himself collected 500 specimens of flora from Western Australia, including:
Diuris emarginata var. emarginata
Diuris emarginata var. pauciflora
Diuris setacea
Epiblema grandiflorum
Microtis alba
Microtis media
Microtis pulchella
Prasophyllum gibbosum
Prasophyllum macrostachyum
Thelymitra canaliculata
Thelymitra tigrina
Thelymitra fuscolutea

In West Australian Orchids (1930), Emily Pelloe described and illustrated an extensive survey. She provided an English text, paintings, and drawings for the amateur reader, a mixture of impression and scientific illustration of the genera.

Orchids of South Western Australia

 This table has its source as the Second Edition of Hoffman and Brown in 1992

References

Further reading

External links 
 The Species Orchid Society of Western Australia (Inc) — a gallery of orchids from Western Australia
 Orchids from Western and South Australia
 Terrestrial orchids of the south west western australia
 Orchid Conservation Coalition

 List of orchids
Western Australia